Jouars-Pontchartrain is a commune in the Yvelines department in the Île-de-France region in north-central France. It is approximately 35 kilometres from Paris. This city is famous for the Château de Pontchartrain.

Geography 
The town of Jouars-Pontchartrain is located 35 km west of Paris, 18 km west of Versailles and 22 km from Rambouillet, on a buttress which delimits the western end of the plain of Versailles and at the foot from which begins the plain of Montfort-l'Amaury. Its territory is irrigated by the Mauldre whose south-north oriented course follows the eastern limit of the town and receives in the park of the Château de Pontchartrain the Élancourt brook, a diversion of which feeds its pond. This brook, oriented east-west, is enlarged a little upstream by the Maurepas brook which joins it at Chennevières.

Hamlets of the municipality 
The commune comprises seven hamlets:

 Pontchartrain, in the north of the municipal territory, heart of the municipality, where are located, around the town hall, the Saint-Lin church and the Saint-Louis hospital, the majority of local shops and most of housing.
 Chennevières, south-east of Pontchartrain and adjoining it. It is a residential and old hamlet, formerly a humid places where the culture of hemp prospered.
 La Richarderie, to the east of Chennevières and adjoining it, is a semi-residential, semi-rural hamlet.
 Jouars, away to the south of Pontchartrain, has a church and has only a few dwellings and rural farms.
 Ergal, in the far east and on the edge of the municipal territory is adjoining the hamlet of Launay in the municipality of Élancourt, half-residential, half-rural.
 Les Mousseaux, south of Jouars, on the edge of the municipal territory and adjoining the hamlet of Villeneuve (parc aux Loups) in the municipality of Maurepas, is half-residential, half-rural with a few small craft businesses.
 La Dauberie, a very wooded residential area, is on the edge of Saint-Rémy-l'Honoré.

The last two hamlets form a kind of enclave between the municipal territories of Maurepas, Coignières, Saint-Rémy-l'Honoré and Le Tremblay-sur-Mauldre.

Population

Monuments
The Château de Pontchartrain built in the 17th century. It was held for many years by the family Phélypeaux.
St Martin's Church from the 12th century.
St-Lin's church from the beginning of the 20th century.

Twin towns
 Hammond, Louisiana, United States
 Cella, Spain

See also
Communes of the Yvelines department

References

Communes of Yvelines